Edward Watkin may refer to:

Edward Watkin (1819–1901), a railway chairman and politician.
Edward Watkin, nephew of the above, railway manager of the Hull and Barnsley Railway
Edward Ingram Watkin (1888–1981), English writer

See also
Edward Watkins (disambiguation)